Star Trek: Renegades is a 2015 American science fiction fan film based on the Star Trek media franchise. It concerns a group of criminals and misfits who undertake a covert mission when suspicion arises that Starfleet's official military chain of command has been compromised by enemy agents. It was funded largely through crowdsourcing, and the film's producers said they would submit it to CBS as a spec TV pilot. The completed pilot film was released for public viewing via YouTube beginning August 24, 2015.

Plans were announced for a Renegades web-based series, but in 2016 the overt Star Trek elements and characters were removed to avoid legal complications as a result of the Star Trek: Axanar lawsuit.

Premise
Ten years after the starship Voyagers return from the Delta Quadrant, the Federation is in a crisis. The Federation's main suppliers of dilithium crystals (the primary catalyst for the fuel used in faster-than-light travel) are disappearing. Space and time have folded around several planets, isolating them from outside contact. The phenomenon is unnatural – someone or something is causing it to happen. The need to stop this necessitates drastic measures, some of which are outside the Federation’s normal jurisdiction.

Admiral Pavel Chekov, head of Starfleet Intelligence, turns to Commander Tuvok, Voyagers former security officer and current head of the newly reorganized Section 31, Starfleet's autonomous intelligence and defense organization. Tuvok must put together a new covert, renegade crew – mostly outcasts and rogues, and even criminals. This new crew is tasked with finding out what is causing the folding of time and space, and stopping it at all costs. But will they be able to put aside their differences and stop trying to kill one another in time to accomplish their mission?

Cast

 Walter Koenig as Admiral Pavel Chekov
 Adrienne Wilkinson as Captain Lexxa Singh
 Sean Young as Dr. Lucien
 Manu Intiraymi as Icheb
 Gary Graham as Ragnar
 Robert Picardo as Dr. Lewis Zimmerman
 Corin Nemec as Captain Alvarez
 Bruce A. Young as Borrada
 Tim Russ as Tuvok
 Chalet Lizette Brannan as Shane Rallent
 Chasty Ballesteros as Ronara
 Edward Furlong as Fixer
 Courtney Peldon as Shree
 Crystal Conway as Cadet Chekov
 Cirroc Lofton as Jacob
 Larissa Gomes as T’Leah
 Tarah Paige as Commander Petrona
 Cela Scott as Lexxa's Mother
 Kevin Fry as Jaro Ruk
 Clint Carmichael as Moordenaarr
 Rico E. Anderson as Boras
 Vic Mignogna as Garis
 Richard Herd as Admiral Owen Paris
 Madison Russ as Cadet Madison
 Grant Imahara as Lt. Masaru
 Jason Matthew Smith as Malbon
 Herbert Jefferson Jr. as Admiral Grant (Ben) Satterlee 
 Sinn Bodhi as Syphon Guard

Production

Development
The team behind Renegades had previously produced the fan film Star Trek: Of Gods and Men. Renegades was shot at Laurel Canyon Studios in Los Angeles, using green screen techniques. Principal photography commenced on October 2, 2013, and was completed on October 16, 2013, in Los Angeles.

The premise for Renegades originated on the final day of the Of Gods and Men shoot. Jack Treviño made the suggestion of a series in which the cast had to work outside of the boundaries of Starfleet. Writer Ethan Calk later credited this as being the origin of the idea.

The production team announced plans for three possible outcomes from the film: CBS picks it up for a series; it is made into a stand-alone film; or it would be the first episode of an Internet-based series. Ultimately it was made into a stand-alone film. Its running time is 90 minutes.

Financing
Primary financing was via three successful Kickstarter and Indiegogo campaigns in 2012, 2013, and 2014. Total raised for the film  was $375,038. For reference, the film Star Trek Into Darkness had an estimated budget of $190 million. On November 28, 2015, Renegades reached $300,000 in fund raising according to Kickstarter.

Casting
The cast of Renegades includes several Star Trek alumni, who in some cases reprised their former roles. Garrett Wang was to return as Harry Kim, but had scheduling conflicts with his involvement in Unbelievable!!!!!, a comedy film with other Star Trek alumni actors. Wang expressed interest in returning at a later date. J. G. Hertzler was originally set to play Borrada, the film's main antagonist, but had since taken political office in New York.

Rico E. Anderson was cast as Boras, Richard Herd was cast as Admiral Owen Paris on October 9, 2012. Courtney Peldon was cast as Shree on November 14, 2012. Tim Russ was cast as Tuvok on December 7, 2012. Walter Koenig was cast as Admiral Pavel Chekov on March 4, 2013. Adrienne Wilkinson was cast as Captain Lexxa Singh, leader of the Renegades and a direct descendant of Khan Noonien Singh. Sean Young was cast as Dr. Lucien. Robert Picardo was cast as Dr. Lewis Zimmerman, the developer of the Emergency Medical Hologram program which bears his likeness. Manu Intiraymi reprised his role from Voyager as the Brunali former Borg, Icheb.

Chasty Ballesteros was cast as Ronara, a troubled young Betazoid. Kevin Fry was cast as Jaro Ruk, an unbalanced former Bajoran freedom fighter. Grant Imahara was cast as Lt. Masaru, an aide to Admiral Pavel Chekov. Vic Mignogna was cast as Garis, a vicious Cardassian prisoner.

Release
Backers of the film were given a limited-time, online-streaming preview of the unfinished film in June 2015.  The official premiere took place at Crest Theater, Los Angeles on Saturday, August 1, 2015. Public release of the completed Star Trek: Renegades film began on its own YouTube channel on August 24, 2015, and surpassed one million views by December 18, 2015.

After the official premiere, Star Trek: Renegades was shown on Sunday, September 6, 2015 at Fan Expo Canada in Toronto. In mid-September 2015 it was released at the Alamo City Comic Con in San Antonio, Texas and The Geek Gathering in Sheffield, Alabama. In mid-October 2015, it premiered at the TRIFI (TCIF3) Film Festival in Richland, Washington. In late October 2015, it premiered at Rocket City NerdCon in Huntsville, Alabama.

Music
The score for the film is by Justin R. Durban.

Sequel and removal of Star Trek branding 
The original plans were for Star Trek: Renegades to be a web series. However, on June 25, 2016, in response to new fan film guidelines, the production team announced that they had removed all Star Trek references from the script for the sequel.

Reception
Drew Turney, of moviehole.net wrote:

In his online video review, Nate "Blunty" Burr said: 

In her review for Trek News, Michelle T. said:

In his review, Josh Roseman said:

Awards
Star Trek: Renegades won seven of thirteen categories in the 2016 Independent Star Trek Fan Film Awards (Best Production Design; Best Special & Visual Effects; Best Sound Design, Editing & Mixing; Best Makeup & Hairstyling; Best Costuming; Best Director and Best Original Story or Screenplay), presented at and by Treklanta.

References

External links
 

2010s science fiction films
Fan films based on Star Trek
Films set in the 24th century
Kickstarter-funded films
Indiegogo projects